VaShawn Mitchell (born November 19, 1976) is an American gospel singer and songwriter. He has produced several Stellar Award-winning projects and songs for Grammy Award winners Vanessa Bell Armstrong and Smokie Norful.

Early life 

Born and raised in Harvey, Illinois, Mitchell graduated from Thornton High School and earned a degree in psychology.

Career 

Mitchell began working with mentor Lonnie Hunter at St. Mark Baptist Church. At age 20, Mitchell's musical potential was noticed by Bishop Larry Trotter and he was hired as the Minister of Music at Chicago's Sweet Holy Spirit Church.

As minister of music he was responsible for every aspect of the department. He went on to produce what have become some of the most noted selections in the African American church Don't Last and My Worship Is For Real. VaShawn also produced and released his first solo project entitled, So Satisfied.

As a songwriter, Mitchell has penned hits for Smokie Norful, Vanessa Bell Armstrong and Bishop Paul Morton. He is also a worship leader and throughout the years he has written several top-selling choir recordings and spawned such memorable hits as My Worship Is For Real and Trouble Don't Last.

In 2012, Mitchell started the Norman Youth and Arts Foundation, named in memory of his grandfather. The Foundation sponsors summer youth camps for the arts in the Chicago area. Mitchell is also one of the only Gospel artists who acts as a spokesperson and is active with the Big Brothers and Big Sisters Foundation.

On December 31, 2016, it was announced that VaShawn Mitchell has been appointed as the General Overseer of Music & Worship Arts of Mount Zion Baptist Church in Nashville, Tennessee.

Recognition 

Mitchell's single, "Nobody Greater", was the most played gospel song of the year in 2011 and spent a combined total of 9 weeks on Billboard's Gospel songs chart.

Mitchell was the most nominated artist at the 27th Annual Stellar Awards; receiving 11 nods and walking away with 6 statues.

He was nominated for 2 Grammy Awards at the 53rd Annual Grammy Awards for Best Gospel Performancefor  "Nobody Greater" and Best Contemporary R&B Gospel Album Triumphant.

Triumphant was also acknowledged by the Gospel Music Association's Dove Awards with 2 nominations for the album Triumphant and hit-single, "Nobody Greater".

Mitchell was honored by his hometown of Harvey, Illinois when they named one of the streets in his neighborhood "VaShawn Mitchell Street.”

His recent single, "Turning Around For Me" from the follow up release Created 4 This entered in Gospel's Top 5 albums chart and R&B Top 25.

In 2013 "How Sweet The Sound" invited Mitchell to sit at the judges table for their popular choir competition.

Discography 

So Satisfied (1998)
Another Chance (2002) as VaShawn Mitchell & New Image Ensemble
Believe in Your Dreams (2005)
Promises (2007) as VaShawn Mitchell and Friends
Triumphant (2010)
My Songbook (2011) (compilation album)
Created 4 This (2012)
Unstoppable (2014) (Some album covers read Unstoppable Extended Play on this 14-track LP.)
Live in Africa (2016)
Cross Music [EP] (2018)
Elements (2019)

References 

American gospel singers
Urban contemporary gospel musicians
Singers from Illinois
People from Harvey, Illinois
Living people
1976 births
Songwriters from Illinois
African-American male songwriters
21st-century African-American male singers